Wake Up the Gypsy in Me is a 1933 Warner Bros. Merrie Melodies animated short, directed by Rudolf Ising and based on the title song written by Lew Lehr, Harry Miller and Lew Pollack. The short was released on May 13, 1933.

Plot
The plot concerns a village of Russian Gypsies, led by a caricature of jazz bandleader Paul Whiteman, generally singing, dancing and whooping it up, when the mad monk Rice-Puddin' (a caricature of Grigori Rasputin) casts his eye on one of the apparently underage girls in the village and has her abducted in an attempt to force himself upon her. The villagers revolt and rescue the girl and give Rice-Puddin' just due.

References

External links
Big Cartoon Database article at 
Toon Zone article at 
 

1933 films
1933 animated films
American black-and-white films
Fictional representations of Romani people
Films scored by Frank Marsales
Films about kidnapping
Films directed by Rudolf Ising
Films set in Russia
Films about Grigori Rasputin
Merrie Melodies short films
1930s Warner Bros. animated short films
1930s English-language films